The 1987 Rothmans Grand Prix was a professional ranking snooker tournament held at the Hexagon Theatre in Reading, England.

Stephen Hendry won in the final 10–7 against Dennis Taylor. It was his first ranking title.

Main draw

Final

References 

1987
Grand Prix
Grand Prix (snooker)